Too Bad She's Bad is a 1955 Italian comedy directed by Alessandro Blasetti. It stars Sophia Loren and is based on Alberto Moravia's story "Fanatico", from his Racconti Romani.

It was shot at the Cinecittà Studios and on location around Rome. The film's sets were designed by the art directors Mario Chiari and Mario Garbuglia.

Plot
Young and shapely Lina Stroppiani and her two accomplices try to con a taxi driver out of his cab and money, with unexpected results when he discovers what they are up to.

Cast
 Vittorio De Sica as "Professor" Vittorio Stroppiani
 Sophia Loren as Lina Stroppiani, the "professor's" daughter
 Marcello Mastroianni as Paolo Silvestrelli, a taxi driver
 Marcella Melnati as Lina's grandmother, the "professor's" mother
 Giorgio Sanna as Peppino
 Michael Simone as Toto
 Umberto Melnati as Robbery victim
 Margherita Bagni as Elsa, Umberto's wife
 Mario Scaccia as Robbery victim
 Wanda Benedetti as Valeria, Mario's wife
 Walter Bartoletti as Brunetto
 Mario Passante as Commissioner
 Memmo Carotenuto as Cesare, a taxi driver
 Giacomo Furia as Luigi, a taxi driver
 Lina Furia as Luigi's wife
 Vittorio Braschi as Fence
 Manlio Busoni as Journalist
 Giulio Calì as Night watchman
 John Stacy as English tourist
 Maria Britneva as Tourist's wife 
 Giulio Paradisi as Server in bar
 Marga Cella as Bar owner
 Pietro Carloni as Intriguing gentleman
 Amalia Pellegrini as Old woman at station
 Mauro Sacripanti as Peppino
 Pasquale Cennamo as Sergeant
 Franco Fantasia as Radiologist
 Nino Dal Fabbro as dishonest car mechanic

References

External links

1955 films
1950s Italian-language films
1955 comedy films
Italian black-and-white films
Films based on works by Alberto Moravia
Films directed by Alessandro Blasetti
Films set in Rome
Films shot in Rome
Films with screenplays by Suso Cecchi d'Amico
Italian comedy films
Films shot at Cinecittà Studios
Films scored by Alessandro Cicognini
1950s Italian films